InstaDad is a 2015 Philippine television drama series broadcast by GMA Network. Directed by Neal del Rosario, it stars Gabby Eigenmann in the title role. It premiered on April 5, 2015. The series concluded on July 5, 2015 with a total of 13 episodes. It was replaced by Alamat in its timeslot.

Cast and characters

Lead cast
 Gabby Eigenmann as Kenneth Monteamor

Supporting cast
 Jazz Ocampo as Maaya "Aya" Monteamor
 Gabbi Garcia as Marikit "Kit" Monteamor
 Ash Ortega as Mayumi "Yumi" Monteamor
 Matet De Leon as Gracia
 Juancho Trivino as Dwight 
 Prince Villanueva as Ikot 
 Ruru Madrid as Zig
 Coleen Perez as Annie
 RJ Padilla as Franco
 Cindy Miranda as Lea

Ratings
According to AGB Nielsen Philippines' Mega Manila household television ratings, the pilot episode of InstaDad earned a 9.7% rating. While the final episode scored an 11.9% rating.

Accolades

References

External links
 
 

2015 Philippine television series debuts
2015 Philippine television series endings
Filipino-language television shows
GMA Network drama series
Television shows set in Quezon City